This is a list of Swedish death metal artists.

A
Aeon
Afflicted
Anata
Arch Enemy
Arise
At the Gates
Autopsy Torment
Amon Amarth

B
Bloodbath

C
Carbonized
Cardinal Sin
Carnage
Cemetary
Centinex
Ceremonial Oath
Comecon
The Crown

D
Dark Tranquillity
Darkane
Death Breath
Defleshed
Demonoid
Desultory
Dimension Zero
Disfear
Dismember
Dissection
Draconian
The Duskfall

E
Edge of Sanity
Entombed
Eternal Oath
Eucharist
Evocation
Expulsion

F 
Face Down
Feared
Fission

G
Gates of Ishtar
General Surgery
God Macabre
Godgory
Grave
Grotesque

H
Hearse
Hypocrisy

I
Impious
In Battle
In Flames
In Mourning
Inevitable End
Insision

K
Kaamos
Katatonia

L 
Liers in Wait

M
Merciless
Miseration
Morbid
Murder Squad

N
Necrophobic
Nihilist
Nine
Nirvana 2002

O
Ofermod
Opeth

P 
Paganizer
Pan.Thy.Monium
The Project Hate MCMXCIX
Parasite Inc.
Pantokrator

R 
Raise Hell
Repugnant
Runemagick

S
Satanic Slaughter
Satariel
Scar Symmetry
Seance
Soilwork
 Solution .45
 Spawn of Possession

T
Theory in Practice
Therion
Tiamat
Tribulation

U
Unanimated
Unleashed

V 
Visceral Bleeding
Vomitory

Z 
Zonaria

References
Footnotes

Works cited

 
Lists of death metal bands by region